This is a list of notable Malaysians of Indian origin, including original immigrants who obtained Malaysian citizenship and their Malaysian descendants. Entries on this list are demonstrably notable by having a linked current article or reliable sources as footnotes against the name to verify they are notable and define themselves either full or partial Indian origin, whose ethnic origin lie in India.

This list also includes emigrant Malaysians of Indian origin and could be taken as a list of famous Malaysians of Indian origin.

Academicians
 Chandra Muzaffar
 Lloyd Fernando
 Jomo Kwame Sundram, Economist
 K. S. Maniam
 Shan Ratnam
 Muthucumaraswamy Sornarajah
 Abdullah Abdul Kadir

Activists, social workers, environmentalist and lawyers

 Kamal Bamadhaj, political science student and human rights activist, who was killed in the Dili Massacre in East Timor on 12 November 1991
 Rasammah Bhupalan, social activist
 Param Cumaraswamy, high-profile Malaysian lawyer from Kuala Lumpur; Chair of the Malaysian Bar Council from 1986 to 1988; United Nations Special Rapporteur on the Independence of Judges and Lawyers by the UN Commission on Human Rights from 1994 to 2003
 Mary Shanthi Dairiam, Malaysian human rights and women's rights advocate; United Nations official
 K. L. Devaser
 Irene Fernandez (1946–2014)
 Charles Hector, Malaysian human rights advocate and activist
 S. M. Mohamed Idris, consumer rights activist
 Hans Isaac, Malaysian actor, producer, director and a former model
 G. Rama Iyer
 M. Manoharan, prominent lawyer, politician, HINDRAF (legal adviser)
 Gengadharan Nair
 Cecil Rajendra, human rights activist
 R. Ramani, second president of Malaya Bar Council; first Asian president of Malaya Bar Council
 Ravichandran, Tamil film actor who played lead roles in Tamil movies of the 1960s and 1970
 Uma Sambanthan
 D. R. Seenivasagam
 Mahadev Shankar
 Nisha Ayub, Malaysian transgender rights activist.
 Bishan Singh Ram Singh, environmentalist
 Gurmit Singh, Singaporean actor of part Malaysian-Punjabi descent
 Karpal Singh (1940–2014), prominent Malaysian politician, lawyer and human rights activist
 Murugesan Sinnandavar
 Mary Shanthi Dairiam She was the elected member from Malaysia to the Committee on the Elimination of All Forms of Discrimination against Women (2005–2008)
 Ambiga Sreenevasan, ex-president of the Malaysian Bar Council and active activist
 Steven Thiru, current president of Malaysian Bar
 Ramon Tikaram, British stage and screen actor
 P. Uthayakumar, founder of HINDRAF
 Chacko Vadaketh, Malaysian actor, writer, television personality and MC
 Irene Xavier, women's rights activist
 Latheefa Koya, fifth Chief Commissioner of the Malaysian Anti-Corruption Commission (MACC) from June 2019 to March 2020.
 Ivy Josiah

Actresses and female models

 Amelia Thripura Henderson, Malaysian teenage actress
 Andrea Fonseka,Malaysian model, television presenter, actress and beauty pageant titleholder 
 Anaika Soti, Bollywood and Kollywood actress; attended high school in Malaysia
 Deborah Priya Henry, winner of Miss Malaysia 2011, television personality, and actress
 Haanii Shivraj (1991–2014), Malaysian actress 
 Kavita Sidhu, actress and former beauty queen
 Kiran Jassal, Miss Universe Malaysia 2016
 Melinder Bhullar, Miss Malaysia World 2013
 Nadine Ann Thomas, winner of Miss Malaysia 2010
 Neelofa
 Nicole Arumugam, British actress
 Pushpa Narayan, Malaysia actress and model
 Ramya Raj, Malaysia-born actress who acts in Tamil cinema
 Rubini Sambanthan, former beauty queen and model. She stars in the sixth cycle of Asia's Next Top Model. 
 Sabrina Beneett, winner of Miss Malaysia 2014
 Sangeeta Krishnasamy, actress and model; first Malaysian woman to act in a Tamil movie
 Nithya Shree, actress and makeup artist 
 Sharon Alaina Stephen, Malaysian actress
 Shuba Jay, Malaysian actress; was killed, together with her husband and daughter, in the shootdown of Malaysia Airlines Flight 17
 Tatiana Kumar, Miss World Malaysia 2016
 Thanuja Ananthan, Miss World Malaysia 2009-2010
 Vanessa Tevi, winner of Miss Malaysia 2015
 Shweta Sekhon, winner of Miss Universe Malaysia 2019 and Miss World Malaysia 2016

Ancient rulers
 Tun Ali of Malacca, fourth Bendahara of the Malaccan Sultanate
 Tun Mutahir of Malacca, famous bendahara of the Malaccan Sultanate
 Tun Fatimah, daughter to the Malaccan Bendahara who lived during the 16th century; was married to Malacca's Sultan Mahmud Shah as one of his consorts after all her male siblings were executed

Arts and entertainment
 Adam Jagnawi
 'Punnagai Poo' Gheetha, the first female producer of Tamil films
 Hans Isaac, Malaysian actor, producer, director, and former model
 K. Haran, film director and screenwriter,
 Huzir Sulaiman, Malaysian actor, director, and writer
 V. Nagaraj, prominent Malaysian director
 B. S. Rajhans, Malaysia's first filmmaker
 Praboo Ariva, Malaysia youngest director
 Prem Nath, Malaysia director
 Pria Viswalingam, Malaysian-born Australian documentary and filmmaker 
 Redza Piyadasa
 Rani Moorthy, Malaysian-born playwright, actress, and artistic director of Rasa Productions
 Sharad Sharan, journalist and film director
 Solamalay Namasivayam, artist
 Syed Thajudeen, artist
 Zabrina Fernandez, television producer
 Geraldine Viswanathan, Australian actress
 Zulkiflee Anwar Haque, cartoonist

Astronaut
 S. Vanajah, one of the finalists for Malaysia's Angkasawan programme

Business people and entrepreneurs
 Ananda Krishnan, 3rd richest man in Malaysia, has a son who is a Theravada Buddhist monk known as Ajahn Siripanyo.
 Arul Kanda Kandasamy, Ex-President and CEO of 1Malaysia Development Berhad
 Bastianpillai Paul Nicholas, first Asian banker in British Malaya
 Doraisingam Pillai, CEO of Lotus chain of restaurants and companies
 Emmanuel Daniel, founder of The Asian Banker
 G. Gnanalingam, current executivei chairman of Westports Malaysia Sdn Bhd
 Maha Sinnathamby, founder of Greater Springfield
 Naraina Pillai, social entrepreneur and businessman, who spent most of his life in Singapore during the colonial period; of Tamil origins, he greatly contributed to the Tamil community in Singapore
 Ninian Mogan Lourdenadin
 K. L. Palaniappan, architect, businessman, and executive director of MK Land
 Shoba Purushothaman, co-founder of The NewsMarket
 K. R. Somasundram, Head of National Land Finance Co-Operative
 K. Thamboosamy Pillay, a significant figure of Kuala Lumpur and Sri Mahamariamman Temple, Kuala Lumpur
 Tony Fernandes, Malaysian entrepreneur and founder of Tune Air Sendirian Berhad; introduced the first budget, no-frills, and low-cost airline, AirAsia, to Malaysia and Asia with the tagline "Now Everyone Can Fly"
 Vinod Balachandra Sekhar, businessman, president and Group Chief Executive of Putra Group
 Vijandren Ramadass, founder of Lowyat.net
 Weeratunge Edward Perera, Malaysian Sinhalese educator, businessman and social entrepreneur
 A.K. Nathan
 Vijay Eswaran

Comedians
 Indi Nadarajah, actor, comedian, and singer based in Kuala Lumpur, Malaysia
 Kavin Jayaram, stand-up comedian

Criminals
 Nagaenthran K. Dharmalingam, drug trafficker executed in Singapore
 Pannir Selvam Pranthaman, drug trafficker sentenced to death in Singapore
 Datchinamurthy Kataiah, drug trafficker sentenced to death in Singapore
 Gobi Avedian, drug trafficker sentenced to 15 years' jail and ten strokes of the cane for drug trafficking in Singapore
 Kalwant Singh Jogindar Singh, drug trafficker executed in Singapore

Dancers
 January Low Wye San (born 1985), classical dancer of Orissi and Bharathanatyam forms

Deejays and television personalities
 Jonathan Putra, television host and actor, Channel V VJ, model, and musician
 Rueben Thevandran (Burn), Malaysian radio personality, television host, singer, and voice-over artist

Doctors
 M. K. Rajakumar
 T. Sachithanandan
 Thirunavuk Arasu Sinnathuray
 Yohannan John

Fashion designer
 Bernard Chandran, Malaysia's "King of Fashion"

Freedom fighters and nationalists
 S. A. Ganapathy, veteran of the communist underground resistance to Japanese occupation and postwar trade unionist in then Malaya; first president of the 300,000-strong Pan Malayan Federation of Trade Unions (PMFTU); was hanged by the colonial authorities in 1949 after being convicted for allegedly being in possession of firearms
 Janaky Athi Nahappan, one of the earliest women involved in the fight for Malaysian (then Malaya) independence
 John Thivy, founding president of the Malayan Indian Congress
 Rasammah Bhupalan, Malaysian freedom fighter and social activist
 V. T. Sambanthan, a Founding Father of Independent Malaysia and the fifth president of the Malaysian Indian Congress
 V. Manickavasagam, Malaysian freedom fighter and the sixth president of the Malaysian Indian Congress
 R. G. Balan

Journalists   
 M. G. G. Pillai, political activist and journalist
 Rehman Rashid, journalist

Legal authorities
 Augustine Paul
 Balasubramaniam Perumal
 Baltej Singh Dhillon, first Royal Canadian Mounted Police officer allowed to wear a turban
 Gengadharan Nair, high courts of Malaysia
 K. S. Rajah, Senior Counsel and former Judicial Commissioner of the Supreme Court of Singapore
 G. Rama Iyer
 K. Thanabalasingam
Steven Thiru, prominent Malaysian lawyer and former President of Malaysian Bar.
 Tommy Thomas, barrister and former Attorney General of Malaysia

Literary figures
 Charlene Rajendran
 John Davies, archivist, writer, and received the prestigious Ahli Mangku Negara award
 K. S. Maniam, novelist and academician
 Munshi Abdullah, early Malayan historian and the father of modern Malay literature
 Preeta Samarasan, finalist for the Commonwealth Writers Prize 2009
 Rani Manicka, author and novelist
 Selvakkumar Thirunavukarasu, author, columnist, radio and television personality on Vastu Shastra and ancient secrets
 Shamini Flint
 Malachi Edwin Vethamani, Malaysian-born Indian poet, writer, editor, bibliographer, academic and critic
 Uthaya Sankar SB, Malaysian writer

Martial artists
 Joe Thambu

Mountaineers
 M. Moorthy, member of the first group of Malaysians to successfully climb Mount Everest
 M. Magendran, the first Malaysian Man who climbed the Mount Everest on 1997

Musicians
Alvin Anthons, entertainer, professional emcee, event manager, radio DJ and singer
 Ash Nair, Malaysian alternative musician and former contestant of season two of Malaysian Idol
 C Loco, now known as Sashi C Loco, co-founder of Poetic Ammo
 Chakra Sonic, Malaysian hip hop musician
 Dave Gahan, English singer-songwriter, member of Depeche Mode; father is Malaysian-Indian
 David Arumugam, Malaysian singer and founder of Alleycats
 Dhilip Varman, singer, lyricist, and composer
 Gerald Sellan, songwriter, composer and drum player for Malaysian/American rock band, Beat the system
 Guy Sebastian, Australian pop, R&B, and soul singer-songwriter who was the first winner of Australian Idol in 2003; currently a judge on the Australian version of The X Factor
 Harikrish Menon, singer and songwriter 
 Jaclyn Victor, winner of the first Malaysian Idol and current number-one pop singer of Malaysia; acted in many Malaysian and Tamil movies
 Kamahl, cabaret or easy listening singer and recording artist
 Loganathan Arumugam, Malaysian singer
 Moots, frontman and rapper for the famous rap rock band Pop Shuvit
 Manjit Singh Gill
 Prema Lucas
 Prema Yin, Malaysian musician and singer
 Prashanthini, playback singer in Tamil cinema
 Reshmonu, singer-songwriter from Malaysia who does mostly English songs
 Ronnie Pereira, lead guitarist and singer of the 1970s band Revolvers
 Shanmugam Arumugam, guitarist
 Shree Chandran, rapper and music producer
 Stewart Sellan, electric and acoustic guitar player for Malaysian/American rock band, Beat the System
 Sukhjit Singh Gill, member of Goldkartz
 Tanita Tikaram, British pop-folk singer-songwriter
 Malaysia Vasudevan, Tamil playback singer and actor in the Tamil film industry
 Yogi B, often referred to as Kavidhai Kundargal; known as the godfather of Tamil rap; currently famous rapper in Kollywood; co-founder of Poetic Ammo
 Yugendran, playback singer in Tamil cinema

Politicians

Religious
 Ven. Dr. Kirinde Sri Dhammananda Nāyaka Thero, Sri Lankan Buddhist monk and scholar, often regarded as Chief High Priest of Malaysia and Singapore
 Ven. Datuk K. Sri Dhammaratana, Sri Lankan Buddhist monk and instrumental in setting up Ti-Ratana Welfare Society
 Antony Selvanayagam, Bishop Emeritus of the Diocese of Penang
 Anthony Soter Fernandez, Archbishop Emeritus of the Roman Catholic Archdiocese of Kuala Lumpur
 Murphy Pakiam, metropolitan archbishop of the Roman Catholic Archdiocese

Scientists
 Alastair Robinson
 Mahaletchumy Arujunan, listed as one of the 100 most influential people in the field of biotechnology by the 7th edition of The Scientist American Worldwide View: A Global Biotechnology Perspective Journal
 Satwant Singh Dhaliwal, Malaysian geneticist, academic and author
 B. C. Shekhar

Surveyors
⬝ Dato Sr K Sri Kandan, Chairman of AECOM (M).

Sportspeople

See also

 List of Malaysians
 List of Malay people
 List of Malaysians of Chinese descent
 List of Singaporean Indians

References

Indian
Lists of people of Indian descent
Indian diaspora in Malaysia
 
Lists of Indian people
Indian